The Church of St. Alphonsus Liguori was a Catholic parish church under the authority of the Roman Catholic Archdiocese of New York, located at 308 West Broadway in SoHo, Manhattan, New York City.

History 
It was established as a mission of Most Holy Redeemer in 1847, as a church to serve German-speaking Catholics. The church was at 10 Thompson Street (between Canal and Grand Streets), and the cornerstone of the church was laid by New York's Archbishop John Hughes on September 8, 1847. It remained a mission of Most Holy Redeemer until 1866, when it was elevated to parish status. The church was staffed by the Redemptorist Fathers, and its first pastor was Rev. F. Nicholas Jaeckel.

In 1870, the church moved to 308 West Broadway (then South Fifth Avenue), where the cornerstone was laid by Cardinal John McCloskey on September 4, 1870, and dedicated on April 7, 1872. The new church was designed by Francis Hempler in the Romanesque style.

By the 1970s the church, which was built on marshy land, was sinking at the rate of about half an inch each year. Due to structural concerns, the parish was closed in October 1979, with the parish records transferred and now housed at St. Anthony of Padua Shrine Church. In 1980, the property was sold and the church demolished in 1981. The Soho Grand Hotel now sits on the site of the church.

References 

Religious organizations established in 1847
Religious organizations established in 1866
Closed churches in the Roman Catholic Archdiocese of New York
Closed churches in New York City
Roman Catholic churches in Manhattan
Redemptorist churches in the United States
1847 establishments in New York (state)
Demolished churches in New York City
Demolished buildings and structures in Manhattan
Buildings and structures demolished in 1981
SoHo, Manhattan